Celtic Tiger Live or more often known Michael Flatley's Celtic Tiger or just Celtic Tiger was an Irish dance show.

History

Michael Flatley, known for Riverdance, Lord of the Dance and Feet of Flames, created Celtic Tiger which debuted in 2005. After being retired for four years, Flatley  announced he was going to tour with a new show. In the summer of 2004 Flatley started the rehearsals of a new show in the SFX Theatre in Dublin, Ireland. In the autumn of 2004 the rehearsals moved on in the Shepperton Studios in London. Michael tried his best to keep the details including the name of the show a secret. Michael announced on his website in April 2005 that he was going to have a preview show of his new show Celtic Tiger in June 2005.

Celtic Tiger had its first performance at a private, invitation-only performance at the NIA Birmingham, England on 17 June 2005.  The show was first performed for the public on 9 July 2005 in the Puskás Stadion (formerly the Népstadion) in Budapest, Hungary. Another preview show was planned for Prague in the Czech Republic, but at the last minute that show was cancelled due to the venue (which included a massive stage specially built for the show) was unsafe for the dancers.

The next show, a preview show for the US tour, was held in Worcester, Massachusetts, on 24 September 2005, followed by a gala performance in New York City's Madison Square Garden on 27 September 2005, the show's official US premiere. The show then toured through Canada and sections of the US, with the final 2005 performance at the Patriot Center in Fairfax, Virginia on 26 November 2005.

Celtic Tiger started its European World Tour on 20 April 2006 at the Point Theatre in Dublin. That show was the first time Flatley had danced in the Point Theatre since he debuted Lord of the Dance. On 15 November 2006, the Autumn and Winter tours for the Celtic Tiger tour of Europe and Asia were cancelled when Flatley was hospitalised for a viral infection for two weeks. Flatley claimed in his website that he would release future touring dates in early 2007 but never did.

Meaning
In the press release announcing the European preview of the show, Michael Flatley explained 'Celtic Tiger portrays the oppression of the Irish people through the ages and the tiger symbolises the awakening of their Spirit and their struggle for freedom. Celtic Tiger is my finest work to date. Budapest is one of my favourite cities in the world and I can think of no greater place to preview my new show."

Credits
 Director – Michael Flatley
 Producer – Michael Flatley
 Choreographer – Michael Flatley
 Leading role – Michael Flatley

Numbers

Act 1
1. The Heartbeat of the Tiger
2. Dancing in the Dark
3. St. Patrick
4. The Sleeping Tiger
5. The Vikings
6. Celtic Fire
7. The Garden of Eden
8. The Redcoats
9. The Famine
10. Four Green Fields
11. Bloody Sunday
12. A Call to Arms
13. The 1916 Rising
14. The Banshee
15. A Nation Once Again

Act 2
16. Freedom
17. A New World
18. The Last Rose
19. Celtic Kittens
20. Capone
21. Forever Free
22. Cowboy Cheerleaders
23. Yankee Doodle Dandy
24. Celtic Fire II
25. The Celtic Tiger
26. Encore - Yankee Doodle Dandy Reprise

Cast
 Michael Flatley
 Thomas Badger

Dancers

 Lisa Anderson
 Thomas Badger
 Desmond Bailey
 Lynsey Brown
 Cherie Butler
 Ciaran Connolly
 Martin Connolly
 Siobhan Connolly
 Arlene Cooke
 Sarah Doherty
 Alison Epsom
 David Folan
 Odette Galea
 Jason Gorman
 Damon Griffiths
 Cassandra Halloran
 Louise Hayden
 Mark Hennessy
 Niall Holly
 Laura Jones
 Joanne Kavanagh
 Megan Luke
 Maeve Madden
 Debbie Maguire
 Rachel Martin
 Owen McAuley
 Kathleen McCarthy
 Brian McEnteggart
 Leigh Ann McKenna
 Kevin McVittie
 Niamh O’Brien (later married to Flatley)
 Damien O’Dochartaigh
 Roisin O’Donnell
 Andrew O'Reilly
 Ian Oswald
 Zoltan Papp
 Gary Pender
 Chris Piper
 Katie Pomfret
 Sarah Redmond
 Margaret Revis
 Sarah Spratt
 Keagan Van Dooren
 Bryana Verner
 Scott Walker
 Stephen Walker

Band

 Jason Duffy — Drums and Percussion (DVD)
 Gary Sullivan -Drums and Percussion (Canada & US tour)
 Declan O'Donoghue — Drums and Percussion (tour)

 Niamh Gallagher — Fiddles
 Maire Egan — fiddles (DVD)

 Aongus Ralston — Bass Guitarist (tour)
 Gavin Ralston — Guitar (DVD & tour)

 Cora Smyth — Fiddles (DVD & tour)
 Brenda Curtin — fiddles (DVD)

 Niamh Gallagher — fiddles (DVD)
 John Colohan — Guitar (DVD)

Vocalists
 Una Gibney (DVD & tour)
 Paul Harrington (DVD and tour)

Tour dates

Cancelled shows

References

External links
 Celtic Tiger Live – Homepage

Irish dance
Touring theatre